Dominic, Dominik or Dominick is a male given name common among Roman Catholics and other Latin-Romans. Originally from the late Roman-Italic name "Dominicus", its translation means "Lordly", "Belonging to God" or "of the Master".

The most prominent Roman Catholic with the name, Saint Dominic, founded the Order of Preachers, also known as Dominican friars. Saint Dominic himself was named after Saint Dominic of Silos.

Variations include Dominicus (Latin rendition), Domenic, Domenico (Italian), Domanic, Dominiq, Domonic, Domènec (Catalan), Domingo (Spanish), Dominykas (Lithuanian), Domingos (Portuguese), Dominggus and Damhnaic (Irish). Feminine forms include Dominica, Dominika, Domenica, Dominga, Domingas, as well as the unisex Dominique, of French origin.

Notable people named Dominic, Dominik or Dominick include:

People

Saints 
 Saint Dominic of Silos (1000–1073), Spanish monk
 Saint Dominic de la Calzada (1019–1109), Spanish saint
Saint Dominic (1170–1221), founder of the Dominican Order
 Saint Dominguito del Val (died 1250), child martyr in Spain
 Saint Dominic Savio (1842–1857), Italian schoolboy
Vietnamese Martyrs, canonized by John Paul II, 15 of whom were known as Dominic

Other religious figures 
Dominic Barberi (1792–1849), Italo-English theologian
Dominic Collins (1566–1602), Irish Jesuit brother and martyr
Dominic Ekandem (1917–1995), Nigerian cardinal who was the first West African Catholic bishop
Dominic Gravina (died 1643), Italian Dominican theologian
Dominic of Evesham, medieval prior of Evesham Abbey in England and writer of histories
Dominic of Prussia (1382–1461), Carthusian monk
Dominic Schram (1722–1797), German Benedictine theologian and canonist
Dominic Tang (1908–1995), last Archbishop of Canton officially recognized by the Holy See
Dominicus Gundissalinus, Spanish archdeacon and scholastic philosopher

Art 
Doménikos Theotokópoulos (1541–1614), Greek painter known as El Greco
Dominic Serres (1722–1793), French-born English painter
Johann Dominik Bossi (1767–1853), Italian painter
Dominic Toubeix (born 1927), French fashion designer who worked as "Dominic" in 1960s New York
Dominic Di Mare (born 1932), American fiber artist and sculptor

Business 
Dominic Barton (born 1962), Ugandan-born Canadian management consultant and business executive
Dominic D'Alessandro (born 1947), Canadian business executive, President and CEO of Manulife Financial
Dominic Grassi (1801–1880), German merchant
Dominik Brunner (1959–2009), German businessman

Film and television 
Andrew Dominik (born 1967), Australian film-maker best known for The Assassination of Jesse James by the Coward Robert Ford
Don Ameche (Dominic Felix Amici, 1908–1993), American actor
Dom DeLuise (Dominick DeLuise, 1933–2009), American actor, comedian, film director, television producer, chef, and author
Dominic Chianese (born 1931), American actor, singer, and musician best known as Corrado Soprano from The Sopranos and Johnny Ola from The Godfather Part II
Dominic Coleman (born 1970), British actor
Dominic Cooper (born 1978), British-born actor who has appeared in The History Boys and The Duchess
Dominic Monaghan (born 1976), English actor best known as Charlie of Lost and Merry from the Lord of the Rings film trilogy
Dominic Ochoa (born 1974), Filipino actor
Dominic Purcell (born 1970), British-born Australian actor who now lives in the United States
Dominic Sena (born 1949), American film director
Dominic West (born 1969), English actor who has appeared in Chicago, The Wire and 300
Dominic Wood (born 1978), English entertainer, magician and presenter best known as one half of the double act Dick and Dom
Dominic Zamprogna (born 1979), Canadian-born actor known for his role on the American soap opera General Hospital
Dominik Diamond (born 1969), Scottish broadcaster, writer, radio presenter and former host of GamesMaster
Dominik Moll (born 1962), French director and screenwriter

Literature 
Dominic Thomas (academic), British academic, UCLA professor, author of books on francophone African literature
Dominik Smole (1929–1992), Slovenian writer and playwright

Media 
Dominic Lawson (born 1956), British journalist; brother of Nigella Lawson, son of Nigel Lawson
Dominic Littlewood (born 1965), British TV presenter
Dominick Dunne (1925–2009), American writer and investigative journalist

Military 
Dominic Gentile (1920–1951), World War II USAAF pilot who broke World War I records of downed aircraft
Dominic L. Pudwill Gorie, American Navy officer and astronaut
Dominic McCarthy (1892–1975), Australian recipient of the Victoria Cross
Dominic McGlinchey (1954–1994), Chief of Staff of the Irish National Liberation Army
Dominic Sheldon, Anglo-Irish soldier of the seventeenth century
Dominik Hieronim Radziwiłł (1786–1813), Polish nobleman and soldier
Dominik von Königsegg-Rothenfels (1673–1751), Austrian imperial Fieldmarshal

Music 
Dominic Behan (1928–1989), Irish songwriter
Dominic Brown (born 1972), English guitarist and singer-songwriter
 Dominic Cifarelli (born 1979), Canadian guitarist for The Chronicles of Israfel (formerly of Pulse Ultra)
Dominic Frontiere (1931–2017), American composer, arranger, and jazz accordionist
Dominic Howard (born 1977), British drummer for Muse
Dominic Masters, lead singer of British band The Others
Dominic Miller (born 1960), Argentinian-born English guitarist
Dominic Salole (born 1974), Somali-Canadian musician professionally known as Mocky
Dominic Smith (born 1973), British rapper and MC known as Dynamite MC
Dominic Sonic (1964–2020), French singer
Dominick Costa (1925–1983), American pop music arranger and record producer

Politics 
D. Clinton Dominick III (1918–2009), New York politician
Dom Mintoff (1916–2012), prime minister of Malta
Domenick L. Gabrielli (1912–1994), New York Court of Appeals judge
Dominggus Mandacan (born 1959), Indonesian governor
Dominic Cummings (born 1971), British political advisor
Dominic Dim Deng (1950–2008), first Minister of Defence for South Sudan
Dominic Fedee, Saint Lucian politician
Dominic Foreman (1933–2020), Australian politician
Dominic Grieve (born 1956), British politician and barrister
Dominic LeBlanc (born 1967), Canadian politician
Dominic Perrottet, Australian politician, Premier of New South Wales
Dominic Raab (born 1974), British conservative politician and government minister
Dominik Mikołaj Radziwiłł (1643–1697), Polish nobleman and politician

Science and medicine 
Dominic A. Antonelli, American astronaut
Dominic Bezzina, a minor Maltese philosopher who specialised in physics and logic
Dominic Borg, a minor Maltese philosopher who specialised in rhetoric and logic
Dominic Corrigan (1802–1880), Irish physician
Dominic Lam (born 1947), American doctor and artist
Dominic Landucci, American aquanaut
Dominic Serventy (1904–1988), Australian ornithologist

Sports 
Dom DiMaggio (1917–2009), American baseball player
Hans Dominik (1872–1945), German science fiction writer
Dominic Adiyiah (born 1989), Ghanaian footballer
Dominic Andres (born 1972), Swiss curler and Olympic champion
Dominic Ball (born 1995), English footballer
Dominic Bird (born 1991), New Zealand rugby union player
Dominic Calvert-Lewin (born 1997), English footballer
Dominic Cork (born 1971), English cricketer
Dominic Corrigan (Gaelic footballer), (born 1962)
Dominik Eberle (born 1996), German American football player
Dominic Jones (born 1987), American football player
Dominic Matteo (born 1974), Scottish footballer
Dominic Moore (born 1980), Canadian professional ice hockey centre
Dominic Stricker (born 2002), Swiss professional tennis player
Dominic Tan (born 1997), Malaysian footballer
Dominic Thiem (born 1993), Austrian professional tennis player
Dominic Thomas (born 1995), English footballer
Dominic Thompson (footballer) (born 2000), English footballer
Dominic Waters (born 1986), American basketball player in the Israel Basketball Premier League
Dominick Cruz (born 1985), American mixed martial artist, former UFC bantamweight champion
Dominik Halmoši (born 1987), Czech professional ice hockey goaltender
Dominik Hašek (born 1965), Czech professional ice hockey goaltender
Dominik Hrbatý (born 1978), Slovakian male tennis player
Dominik Landertinger (born 1988), Austrian biathlete
Dominik Mysterio (born 1997), American professional wrestler
Dominik Paris (born 1989), Italian alpine skier
Dominick Zator (born 1994), Canadian soccer player

Other professions 
Dominic Bohm, German modernist architect
Dominic Holland (born 1969), English comedian and author
Dominic Panganiban (born 1990), Canadian YouTuber and animator
Dominic Wong (1942–2012), official in the Hong Kong Government

Fictional characters 
 Dominic, one of the two rival gang leaders on the Person of Interest TV series, whose nickname was "Mini"
Dominic Flandry, central character in the second half of Poul Anderson's Technic History science fiction series
Dominic Fortune, comic book character
Dominic Greene, primary antagonist in the James Bond film Quantum of Solace
 Dominic Hargan, from Power Rangers Jungle Fury
Dominic Reilly, on the long-running British soap opera Hollyoaks
Dominic Santini, on the series Airwolf
Dominic Sorel, in the 2005–2006 anime and manga series Eureka Seven
 Dominic the Dragon, minor character in the role-playing video game Miitopia
Dominic Toretto, also known as Dom; character from The Fast and the Furious movies
Dominick Carisi, Jr., from Law & Order: Special Victims Unit
Dominick Cobb, from Inception
Dominick the Donkey, the Italian Christmas donkey from a 1960 song by Lou Monte
Dominick Hide, lead character in two episodes of the BBC's Play for Today series
Dominick Marone, from The Bold and the Beautiful
 Dominick Santoro, Nicky Santoro's brother in the 1995 film Casino, based on Michael Spilotro
Dominic Badguy, from Muppets Most Wanted

See also 
Hans Dominik (1872–1945), German science fiction writer
Dom (given name)
Domenic
Domenico
Dominic Burke (disambiguation)
Dominika
Dominique (name)
Nicky
St Dominic (disambiguation)

References 

English masculine given names